Where in the World is Sylvia's seventh album, an independent album released through Red Pony Records. Kimmy Sophia Brown, in her Significato review, states that "Where in the World is a collection of 10 gentle songs presented with original, acoustic arrangements. Sylvia delivers each song in a full, fine voice."

Track listing

Personnel
Sylvia - lead and harmony vocals
John Mock - guitars, mandolin, uilleann pipes, percussion
Matt McGee - acoustic upright bass
Craig Bickhardt - harmony vocals
Aislinn Bickhardt - harmony vocal on "Crazy Nightingale"

Production
Produced by John Mock and Sylvia
Mastered by Tom Endres
Recorded and Mixed by John Mock

All track information and credits were taken from the CD liner notes.

References

2002 albums
Sylvia (singer) albums
Red Pony Records albums